H-58 may refer to:
 H-58 (Michigan county highway)
 H-58 Kiowa or Bell OH-58 Kiowa, a helicopter